Eleanor Katrine Witcombe  (20 September 1923 – 21 October 2018) was an Australian writer who worked extensively in radio, film and television.

Early life and education
Witcombe was born in Yorketown, South Australia where her father ran a farm, and later a grocery store. In 1939, the family drove to Queensland, intending to move to Cooktown, but ending up in Brisbane where Eleanor and her sister Aileen attended Brisbane Girls Grammar School. In 1941, Witcombe left school due to chronic asthma, and the family moved to Sydney, where she attended the National Art School. She worked as a governess at a New South Wales property during World War II, but was unhappy in the role and dreamt of becoming a writer.

Writing career
In 1947, Witcombe was awarded a scholarship at the Mercury Theatre founded by Peter Finch. The following year, the Mosman Theatre Club commissioned her to write three plays for children, which received national acclaim and began her writing career.

In 1952, she moved to England and worked at the BBC as a typist. Whilst in London, she managed to get her play, Smugglers Beware!, produced and performed at Toynbee Hall.

She returned to Australia, and began producing radio scripts for the ABC and the Macquarie and Lux Radio Theatres. In the 1960s, she adapted Smugglers Beware! and the novel Pastures of the Blue Crane for ABC television, and was on the writing team for the sketch comedy series The Mavis Bramston Show on the Seven Network. She was also a founding member of the Australian Writers' Guild (AWG) in 1962.

In the early 1970s, Witcombe adapted two of Norman Lindsay's works: The Magic Pudding for a marionette stage show, and Redheap for television, which resulted in a lifelong friendship with Lindsay's daughter, Jane Glad. She then joined the writing team for the soap opera Number 96. In 1973, she adapted Ethel Turner's Seven Little Australians for ABC television. 

In the late 1970s, Witcombe adapted two novels into film scripts which became part of the Australian film renaissance at the time: The Getting of Wisdom directed by Bruce Beresford, and My Brilliant Career directed by Gillian Armstrong.

Select credits
Smuggler's Beware! (1963 TV drama)
The Mavis Bramston Show
Seven Little Australians (mini series)
Number 96
The Getting of Wisdom (1977)
My Brilliant Career (1979)
Water Under the Bridge (1980)
Jonah (1982)
The Harp in the South (1987)

Awards and honours
Witcombe won the AFI Award for Best Adapted Screenplay in 1978 for The Getting of Wisdom and in 1979 for My Brilliant Career.

In the 2014 Queen's Birthday Honours, Witcombe was made a Member of the Order of Australia for significant service to the arts as a writer for radio, film, television and theatre.

References

External links

Eleanor Witcombe Papers

1923 births
2018 deaths
Australian screenwriters
Australian women screenwriters
Australian women dramatists and playwrights
Members of the Order of Australia
People from South Australia
Australian expatriates in the United Kingdom